"Cowboy Love" is a song written by Jeff Wood and Bill Douglas, and recorded by American country music artist John Michael Montgomery.  It was released in November 1995 as the fourth single from his album John Michael Montgomery.  It peaked at number 4 in both the United States and Canada.

Critical reception
Larry Flick, of Billboard magazine reviewed the song favorably saying that "Montgomery's winning delivery and Hendricks' deft production make this an enjoyable outing.

Music video
The music video features John Michael Montgomery performing the song at a concert. The video starts out going from outside the arena, through the arena, as an instrumental medley of his past hits plays, and then to the stage, where he makes a surprise entry onto the stage as the song begins.

Chart positions
"Cowboy Love" debuted at number 65 on the U.S. Billboard Hot Country Singles & Tracks for the week of November 18, 1995.

Year-end charts

References

John Michael Montgomery songs
1995 singles
Song recordings produced by Scott Hendricks
Atlantic Records singles
1995 songs